Japyx is a genus of diplurans belonging to the family Japygidae. These eyeless, predatory hexapods largely shun direct sunlight, remaining under stones and among detritus, where they use pincer-like cerci to catch their tiny prey.

Species
 Japyx akiyamae (Silvestri, 1928)
 Japyx albanica (Stach, 1922)
 Japyx angulosus (Silvestri, 1918)
 Japyx arnoldii (Ionescu, 1959)
 Japyx barnardi (Silvestri, 1935)
 Japyx beccarii (Silvestri, 1931)
 Japyx beneserratus (Kuwayama, 1928)
 Japyx biangulatus (Silvestri, 1931)
 Japyx bidens (Cook, 1899)
 Japyx biproductus (Silvestri, 1908)
 Japyx bolivari (Silvestri, 1929)
 Japyx brachycerus (Silvestri, 1930)
 Japyx cavicola (Joseph, 1882)
 Japyx constantinii (Silvestri, 1928)
 Japyx contiguus (Silvestri, 1930)
 Japyx devius (Silvestri, 1930)
 Japyx dolinensis (Verhoeff, 1904)
 Japyx doriae (Silvestri, 1930)
 Japyx dux (Skorikow, 1900)
 Japyx erythraeus (Silvestri, 1930)
 Japyx evansi (Silvestri, 1931)
 Japyx faucium (Vehoeff, 1923)
 Japyx feae (Silvestri, 1930)
 Japyx forficularius (Joseph, 1882)
 Japyx froggartti (Silvestri, 1930)
 Japyx fulleri (Silvestri, 1935)
 Japyx gestri (Silvestri, 1930)
 Japyx ghilarovi (Ionescu, 1959)
 Japyx giffardi (Silvestri, 1930)
 Japyx gilli (Silvestri, 1935)
 Japyx girodii (Silvestri, 1928)
 Japyx glauerti (Womersley, 1934)
 Japyx graecus (Verhoeff, 1904)
 Japyx grassii (Verhoeff, 1904)
 Japyx guineensis (Silvestri, 1930)
 Japyx heymonsi (Silvestri, 1931)
 Japyx hutchinsoni (Silvestri, 1935)
 Japyx inferus Carpenter, 1932
 Japyx insuetus (Pagés, 1983)
 Japyx intercalatus (Silvestri, 1933)
 Japyx ishii (Silvestri, 1928)
 Japyx izmir (Paclt, 1957)
 Japyx japonicus (Enderlein, 1907)
 Japyx javanicus (Cook, 1899)
 Japyx jonicus (Silvestri, 1908)
 Japyx kenyanus (Silvestri, 1918)
 Japyx kosswigi Paclt, 1965
 Japyx kuwanae (Silvestri, 1928)
 Japyx leae (Silvestri, 1930)
 Japyx liberiensis (Cook, 1899)
 Japyx mallyi (Silvestri, 1935)
 Japyx meridionalis (Silvestri, 1948)
 Japyx michaelseni (Silvestri, 1930)
 Japyx minutus (Silvestri, 1948)
 Japyx mjoebergi (Silvestri, 1929)
 Japyx nichollsi (Womersley, 1934)
 Japyx nigerianus (Silvestri, 1929)
 Japyx obliquus (Cook, 1899)
 Japyx onkaparinga (Womersley, 1935)
 Japyx papuasicus (Silvestri, 1902)
 Japyx peringueyi (Silvestri, 1935)
 Japyx persequens (Silvestri, 1918)
 Japyx poletii (Silvestri, 1928)
 Japyx proditus (Silvestri, 1918)
 Japyx purcelli (Peringuey, 1902)
 Japyx remyi (Condé & Pagés, 1950)
 Japyx roeweri (Silvestri, 1931)
 Japyx sarbadhikarii (Fernando, 1960)
 Japyx senegalensis (Silvestri, 1930)
 Japyx serratus (Stach, 1929)
 Japyx sharonii (Verhoeff, 1923)
 Japyx sinuosus (Tuxen, 1930)
 Japyx solifugus Haliday, 1864
 Japyx soulei (Bouvier, 1905)
 Japyx sowerbyi (Silvestri, 1928)
 Japyx subductus (Silvestri, 1930)
 Japyx subuncifer (Silvestri, 1930)
 Japyx syriacus (Silvestri, 1911)
 Japyx temperatus (Silvestri, 1930)
 Japyx texanus Hansen, 1930
 Japyx toccii (Silvestri, 1928)
 Japyx tragardhi (Silvestri, 1935)
 Japyx tunisinus (Silvestri, 1902)
 Japyx turcicus Paclt, 1965
 Japyx turneri Ewing, 1941
 Japyx validior (Silvestri, 1931)
 Japyx werneri (Stach, 1929)
 Japyx westraliense (Womersley, 1934)
 Japyx womersleyi (Pagés, 1952)

References

Diplura
Arthropods of Europe